"Eftihos" (Greek:Ευτυχώς; is a platinum  CD single by popular Greek artist Thanos Petrelis released in June 2006 by Heaven Music.The CD single is entirely composed by Phoebus.

Track listing

Music videos
"Anifora"
"Eftihos"

Release history

Credits and personnel

Personnel
Phoebus - music, lyrics, orchestration, programming
Tryfon Koutsourelis - orchestration, programming, keyboards
Giorgos Hatzopoulos - guitars
Achilleas Diamantis - guitars
Giannis Bithikotsis - bouzouki, tzoura, baglama
Fedon Lionoudakis - accordion
Alex Panayi, Paola Komini - background vocals
Vasilis Nikolopoulos - drums, Taiko Drums
Panagiotis Haramis - bass
Thanasis Vasilopoulos - nei
Elli Kokkinou - second vocals

Production
Thodoris Hrisanthopoulos - digital mastering - transfer
Vaggelis Siapatis - sound, computer editing
Phoebus - production management
Vasilis Nikolopoulos - sound, mix

Design
Nikos Vardakastanis - photos
Petros Parashis - artwork

Credits adapted from the album's liner notes.

References

2006 singles
Pop songs
Songs written by Phoebus (songwriter)
Greek songs
2006 songs